Komi Kebir ( [];  or ) is a village under the de facto control of Northern Cyprus, claimed by Cyprus. , it had a population of 812.

Before 1974, Komi Kebir was inhabited both by Greek- and Turkish Cypriots. The Greek Cypriots constituted the majority. In 1973, an estimated 762 people were living in the village, of whom 200 were Turkish- and 562 Greek-Cypriot. 66 students were enrolled at the Greek-Cypriot primary school for the academic year of 1973–74.

At the borders of the village, there are the churches of Saint George, Saint Afksentios and Saint Loukas. There are also the ancient churches of Panagia Kira, Saint George Parouzos, Saint Vasilios (in ruins), Saint Photiou (in ruins) and Saint Katherine (in ruins).

References

Communities in Famagusta District
Populated places in İskele District
Municipalities of Northern Cyprus